Kyaw Hsan (born 20 May 1948) is a former Brigadier-General and previously served as Minister of Cooperatives, Minister of Culture and Minister of Information of Myanmar.

Early life and education 
Kyaw Hsan was born on 20 May 1948 is Monywa, Sagaing Region. He attended high school in Pale. He applied to the Defense Services Academy (DSA) in 1964 but was rejected because he was too small. The next year he reapplied, this time successfully.

Career 
After graduating in 1969, Kyaw Hsan served as battalion commander and then division commander under Vice Senior-General Maung Aye,  a regional commander in Shan State. In 2001 Kyaw Hsan was appointed deputy Minister of Commerce. In September 2002 he was appointed Minister of Information.

Kyaw Hsan had to resign from the military to run for office in 2010 on the ruling Union Solidarity and Development Party platform. He was elected an MP and became Minister of Information and Minister of Culture. A 2011 report in The Irrawaddy said he was one of the more powerful members of the government, and said he had used his control over the media to advance his career.

References

Government ministers of Myanmar
Culture ministers of Myanmar
Information ministers of Myanmar
Defence Services Academy alumni
1948 births
Living people
People from Sagaing Region
Burmese military personnel
Burmese generals
Union Solidarity and Development Party politicians
Members of Pyithu Hluttaw